During the 21st century, there will be 224 solar eclipses of which 77 will be partial, 73 will be annular, 68 will be total and 7 will be hybrids between total and annular eclipses. Of these, two annular and one total eclipse will be non-central, in the sense that the very center (axis) of the Moon's shadow will miss the Earth (for more information see gamma). In the 21st century, the greatest number of eclipses in one year is four, in 2011, 2029, 2047, 2065, 2076, and 2094. The predictions given here are by Fred Espenak of NASA's Goddard Space Flight Center.

At this point, the longest measured duration in which the Moon completely covered the Sun, known as totality, was during the solar eclipse of July 22, 2009. This total solar eclipse had a maximum duration of 6 minutes and 38.86 seconds. The longest possible duration of a total solar eclipse is 7 minutes and 32 seconds. The longest annular solar eclipse of the 21st century took place on January 15, 2010, with a duration of 11 minutes and 7.8 seconds. The maximum possible duration is 12 minutes and 29 seconds. The eclipse of May 20, 2050, will be the second hybrid eclipse in the span of less than one year, the first one being on November 25, 2049.

The table contains the date and time of the greatest eclipse (in dynamical time, which in this case is the time when the axis of the Moon's shadow cone passes closest to the centre of Earth; this is in (Ephemeris Time). The number of the saros series that the eclipse belongs to is given, followed by the magnitude of the eclipse (the fraction of the Sun's diameter obscured by the Moon) and the type of the eclipse (either total, annular, partial or hybrid). For total and annular eclipses, the duration of the eclipse is given, as well as the location of the greatest eclipse (the point of maximum eclipse) and the path width of the total or annular eclipse. The geographical areas from which the eclipse can be seen are listed.

Eclipses

See also 

List of solar eclipses in the 18th century
List of solar eclipses in the 19th century
List of solar eclipses in the 20th century
List of lunar eclipses in the 21st century

References
 Acknowledgement: Eclipse Predictions by Fred Espenak, NASA's Goddard Space Flight Center

Bibliography

21st century-related lists
+21